Kanyadaan is an Indian soap opera created and co-produced by Ekta Kapoor and Shobha Kapoor under their banner Balaji Telefilms. The series premiered in 1999 on Sony Entertainment Television.

Plot
The series revolves around the relationship between a mother played by Kher and her two daughters, one legitimate (Bhatia) and the other illegitimate (Narula). The series explores how the Indian family donates their daughters to their in-laws' house.

Cast 
 Kirron Kher
 Jayati Bhatia
 Poonam Narula
 Hussain Kuwajerwala

References

External links 
 
 Official Website

Balaji Telefilms television series
1999 Indian television series debuts
2000 Indian television series endings
Sony Entertainment Television original programming
Indian television soap operas